Dorcadion quadrimaculatum is a species of beetle in the family Cerambycidae. It was described by Küster in 1848. It is known from Turkey and Greece.

Subspecies
 Dorcadion quadrimaculatum nodicorne Tournier, 1872
 Dorcadion quadrimaculatum quadrimaculatum Küster, 1848

See also
 Dorcadion

References

quadrimaculatum
Beetles described in 1848